The Malaysian Hockey Confederation (MHC) is the national governing body for Malaysia men's national field hockey team, Malaysia women's national field hockey team, Malaysia national under-21 field hockey team, Malaysia national women's under-21 field hockey team, Malaysia national indoor hockey team and Malaysia national women's indoor hockey team than also manage the field hockey in Malaysia. It is affiliated to the Asian Hockey Federation (AHF) and member of the International Hockey Federation (FIH).
The current MHC president is Dato' Sri Subahan Kamal.

Presidents
 Tun Abdul Razak (1957–1976)
 Sultan Azlan Shah (2002–2004)
 Raja Nazrin Shah (2004–2006)
 Mohammad Anwar Mohammad Nor (19 Dec 2006 – 1 November 2008)
 Tengku Abdullah Sultan Ahmad Shah (1 Nov 2008 – 13 May 2015)
 Subahan Kamal (13 May 2015 – present)

Tournaments and events
Malaysia Hockey League
Malaysia Junior Hockey League

See also
Malaysia men's national field hockey team
Malaysia women's national field hockey team

References

External links
 Official website of the Malaysian Hockey Federation

National members of the Asian Hockey Federation
Field hockey in Malaysia
Hockey Confederation
Sports organizations established in 1953
Field hockey governing bodies in Asia